Bafat, also spelled bafad or baffat, is a type of masala used in Mangalorean and Goan cuisines, particularly in Mangalorean Catholic and Goan Catholic cooking. It is commonly made with a mixture of dried and ground chilli peppers, coriander seeds, cumin seeds, mustard seeds, black peppercorn, turmeric, cinnamon and cloves and reflects Portugues and Goan influences. Bafat is most well-known for its use in a pork stew, which is also called bafat or "dukra maas", that is commonly served with sanna. It is also used to season other meats and vegetables.

See also
 Sarapatel

References

Mangalorean cuisine
Herb and spice mixtures